KJSM-FM (97.7 FM) is a radio station licensed to Augusta, Arkansas, United States. The station is currently owned by Family Worship Center Church.

History
The station went on the air as KABK-FM on 1979-11-19. On 2003-03-04, the station changed its call sign to the current KJSM.

References

External links
http://sonlifetv.com

JSM-FM
Augusta, Arkansas